A legacy hero is a type of character, usually a superhero, that is the descendant or relative of an already or previously existing hero who either inherits or adopts the name and attributes of the original.

One of the earliest examples of this character type was comic strip hero The Phantom, assumed to be immortal by his enemies. The identity was actually used by various members of a single family, the descendants of Christopher Walker.

The term is used most often to refer to characters published by DC and Marvel Comics. Family franchises such as DC's Batman, Superman, Wonder Woman, Atom, Black Canary, Captain Marvel, The Flash, Green Lantern, Hawkman, Hawkwoman, The Ray and Robin or Marvel's Black Knight, Captain America, Captain Marvel, Hulk, Iron Man, Spider-Man, Thor, Wolverine, have seen several characters take up the name and abilities of the original.

In the video games series, Assassin's Creed, many of the game's characters are descended from bloodlines of Assassins, in the Donkey Kong franchise, it is stated that Cranky Kong is the original Donkey Kong from the 1981 arcade game, while the Donkey Kong in later games is his grandson.

Legacy villain
In opposition, there have been legacy villains in fiction as well. In comics, examples are DC's Blockbuster, Captain Boomerang, and Clayface; Marvel's Green Goblin, Mysterio, and Electro.

In Disney's Gargoyles, a multi-generational line of villains known as the Hunter share the same scar on their faces.

References

Stock characters
Superhero fiction themes